Mariann Birkedal in Stavanger) is a Norwegian beauty queen who has represented Norway in Miss Universe 2008 and Miss World 2010.

Miss Universe 2008
After participating in Frøken Norge 2008 and placing first runner-up, she was selected in a separate competition to be her country's representative to the 2008 Miss Universe pageant held in Nha Trang, Vietnam on July 14, 2008.

Miss World 2010
Birkedal competed and won the 2010 Frøken Norge pageant celebrated in Noresund on June 26, gaining the right to represent Norway in Miss World 2010.

As the official representative of her country to the 2010 Miss World pageant, held in Sanya, China, she won the Miss World Top Model fast-track event on October 23, and automatically became one of the Top 25 semifinalists, the first Norwegian woman to place in Miss World since 2003.

Birkedal also placed third in both Miss World Beach Beauty and Miss World Sportswoman fast-track events of Miss World 2010, which made her the early bookies' favourite to win the contest. In the end, she finished in the Top 7.

References

External links
Official Frøken Norge website

Norwegian beauty pageant winners
Living people
Miss Universe 2008 contestants
Miss World 2010 delegates
Miss Norway
1980s births
People from Stavanger